Rita Akosua Dickson (born 1 August 1970) is a Ghanaian phytochemist and the first female Vice-Chancellor of the Kwame Nkrumah University of Science and Technology.

Early life and education 
She attended St. Monica's Secondary School in Mampong-Ashanti where she studied for her GCE Ordinary Level examinations and later Wesley Girls’ High School in Cape-Coast, for her GCE Advanced Level examinations. She graduated from the Kwame Nkrumah University of Science and Technology with a bachelor's degree in pharmacy in 1994 and acquired an MPharm at the same university in pharmacognosy in 1999. She received her PhD in pharmacology from King's College London in 2007.

Career 
Dickson began her career as a lecturer at the Kwame Nkrumah University of Science and Technology in the year 2000. After leaving to pursue further studies in the UK, she returned to Ghana in 2007 and continued lecturing at the Kwame Nkrumah University of Science and Technology.  In 2009 she was promoted to a senior lecturer and further to an associate professor in 2014. In September 2018, she was appointed the pro vice chancellor of the Kwame Nkrumah University of Science and Technology, making her the first female to occupy that position. Prior to her appointment as pro vice chancellor, she was the dean of the faculty of pharmacy and pharmaceutical sciences. Dickson currently serves as a board member of the Pharmacy Council and Pharmaceutical Society of Ghana. On June 25, 2020 Kwame Nkrumah University of Science And Technology announced her appointment as the first female Vice Chancellor of the university effective 1 August 2020. She is to serve a four-year term.

Her work as a phytochemist covers the areas of bioactive natural products in the management of communicable and non-communicable diseases.

Research 
Dickson's research has been mainly about products derived from Ghanaian plants, with special emphasis on those with anti-infective, wound-healing, anti-inflammatory, anti-pyretic and antidiabetic properties, based on their ethnopharmacological usage.

Personal life 
She is married to Nana Dickson with four children. She is a Christian and fellowships with Grace Baptist Church, Amakom in Kumasi.

Awards 
Dickson was awarded a Commonwealth Scholarship to pursue a PhD at Kings College, University of London, UK in 2003.

References

Living people
Kwame Nkrumah University of Science and Technology alumni
Alumni of King's College London
Vice-Chancellors of universities in Ghana
Ghanaian women academics
Women academic administrators
People educated at Wesley Girls' Senior High School
Vice-Chancellors of the Kwame Nkrumah University of Science and Technology
St. Monica's Senior High School alumni
Academic staff of Kwame Nkrumah University of Science and Technology
1970 births